Pavel Grinfeld (also known as Greenfield) is an American mathematician and associate professor of Applied Mathematics at Drexel University working on problems in moving surfaces in applied mathematics (particularly calculus of variations), geometry, physics, and engineering.

Biography
Grinfeld received his PhD in Applied Mathematics from MIT in 2003; followed by two years as a postdoctoral fellow at the MIT Department of Earth, Atmosphere and Planetary Sciences, conducting research in geodynamics. He joined the Department of Mathematics at Drexel University in 2005; currently teaching Linear Algebra, Differential Equations, and Tensor calculus.

Grinfeld is the author of the dynamic fluid film equations. Grinfeld co-authored with Haruo Kojima of Rutgers University on the instability of the 2S electron bubbles.

He is the author of a textbook on Tensor Calculus (2013) as well as an e-workbook on Linear Algebra. He has recorded hundreds of video lectures; several dozen on Tensors (in a video course which may accompany his textbook) as well as over a hundred shorter videos on linear algebra. Many of these are available on YouTube as well as other sites.

Research interests
Hydrodynamics and fluid films dynamics, thermodynamics and phase transformations, minimal surfaces and calculus of variations.

Other Activities 
Grinfeld is the founder of Lemma, Inc. which has developed the online learning system also called Lemma (https://www.lem.ma)

Bibliography

References

External links
 Grinfeld's site at Drexel University
 
 Grinfeld's Lemma site with videos, practice problems, and textbooks
 

1974 births
Living people
21st-century American mathematicians
Massachusetts Institute of Technology School of Science alumni
Drexel University faculty